Carl Giskra (29 January 1820, in Mährisch-Trübau – 1 June 1879, in Baden bei Wien) was a statesman of the Austrian Empire.

1820 births
1879 deaths
People from Moravská Třebová
People from the Margraviate of Moravia
Moravian-German people
Interior ministers of Austria
Members of the Austrian House of Deputies (1861–1867)
Members of the Austrian House of Deputies (1867–1870)
Members of the Austrian House of Deputies (1870–1871)
Members of the Austrian House of Deputies (1871–1873)
Members of the Austrian House of Deputies (1873–1879)
Members of the Moravian Diet